Sandjacking is the process of lifting concrete and filling in the space underneath with sand, which allows for frugal repairs in concrete applications. The basic premise is to lift concrete and to then fill the resultant void absolutely with compacted sand. Sandjacking includes the careful assessment of what is required to restore concrete to its original profile and the intelligent application of different materials to keep it that way. The filling provides the long term repair and protection of any flat concrete surface. Since the lifting and filling processes are distinctly separate events, each can be accomplished precisely.

Overview
The lifting process can utilize many different techniques, depending upon situational variables. The filling process uses compressed air to blow dry sand into any existing voids. The sand travels through hoses and nozzles to the void and deposits continuously. The sand travels wherever the air goes. It gradually loses momentum and deposits, nestling in with other grains of sand at 99-100% density (Midwest Testing). The filling can be performed from the surface of the slab or from the side of the slab if available.

Separating the fill process from the lifting process is crucial in this system. After the void is filled with sand, the lift occurs. The concrete is lifted about ½ - ¾ inches and the filling process resumes. When the void is full the process starts again with the lift and repeating the iterations as many times as is necessary.

The benefit of sandjacking is the control of moisture. There are more voids under concrete than the average person would presume. Any void will acquire moisture, subjecting the slab to endless wet-dry cycles (freeze-thaw in colder climates). If the voids are full of sand, water can't accumulate in sufficient quantity to be destructive. Moisture in the lifting process is also undesirable; the only way to reduce it is to reduce the quantity of lifting material. It's important to fill first, then lift creating a new void which is then filled with sand through the same hole. Since dry material will blow greater distances the holes required are few. Another benefit of the process is no point loading and the entire lift is gentle on the slab.

See also
 Concrete leveling

References

Concrete